DYAM-TV is a commercial television station owned by GMA Network Inc. Its transmitter is located at Barangay Milibili, Roxas, Capiz.

GMA TV-5 Roxas currently airing program 
One Western Visayas (Monday to Friday) - GMA Iloilo flagship afternoon newscast
GMA Regional TV Early Edition - (Monday to Friday) GMA Iloilo flagship morning newscast

See also
DYXX-TV
List of GMA Network stations

 

GMA Network stations
Television stations in Roxas, Capiz
Television channels and stations established in 1994
1994 establishments in the Philippines